The German Evangelical Immanuel Congregational Church (Immanuel Congregational Church; ; Immanuel Congregational United Church of Christ) in Brush, Colorado is a historic church at 209 Everett Street.  It was built in 1927 and was added to the National Register in 2005.

It was deemed notable " for its architectural significance. The church embodies the distinctive characteristics of the Late Gothic Revival style of architecture, including its brick construction, two corner towers with decorative corner pilasters, pointed arch windows, two slightly recessed entrances, and its steeply-pitched cross-gable roof. The building is also architecturally significant because it was designed by Denver architect, Walter H. Simon and to a lesser degree because it was constructed under the direction of Frank M. Kenney, a well-known Colorado building contractor."

References

Congregational churches in Colorado
German-American culture in Colorado
Churches on the National Register of Historic Places in Colorado
Gothic Revival church buildings in Colorado
Churches completed in 1927
Churches in Morgan County, Colorado
National Register of Historic Places in Morgan County, Colorado
1927 establishments in Colorado